The Peru women's national field hockey team represents Peru in women's international field hockey and is organized by the Federación Deportiva Peruana de Hockey, the governing body of field hockey in Peru.

Peru has never qualified for the Summer Olympics, the World Cup. In 2019 they appeared in their first Pan American Games. After they won the 2021 Women's Pan American Challenge they qualified for their first ever Women's Pan American Cup in 2022.

Tournament record

Pan American Games
 2019 – 7th place

Pan American Cup
2022 – 7th place

Pan American Challenge
 2015 – 
2021 –

South American Games
 2018 – 7th place
 2022 – 5th place

South American Championship
 2003 – 5th place
 2013 – 6th place
 2016 – 5th place

Hockey World League
2014–15 – Round 1
2016–17 – Round 1

FIH Hockey Series
2018–19 – First round

Bolivarian Games
 2013 –

See also
 Peru men's national field hockey team

References

field hockey
Americas women's national field hockey teams
National team